The Great Caruso is a 1951 biographical film produced by Metro-Goldwyn-Mayer and starring Mario Lanza as famous operatic tenor Enrico Caruso. The movie was directed by Richard Thorpe and produced by Joe Pasternak with Jesse L. Lasky as associate producer. The screenplay, by Sonya Levien and William Ludwig, was suggested by the biography Enrico Caruso His Life and Death by Dorothy Caruso, the tenor's widow. The original music was composed and arranged by Johnny Green and the cinematography by Joseph Ruttenberg. Costume design was by Helen Rose and Gile Steele.

The film is a highly fictionalized biography of the life of Caruso.

Cast

The Opera Montage are Metropolitan Opera stars, notably sopranos  Teresa Celli, Lucine Amara and Marina Koshetz, mezzo-soprano Blanche Thebom, baritone Giuseppe Valdengo and bass Nicola Moscona.

Histriocity
Although The Great Caruso follows the basic facts of Caruso's life, several of the characters and incidents portrayed in the movie are fictional. Members of the Caruso family in Italy successfully sued Metro-Goldwyn-Mayer for damages because of this and the studio was also ordered to withdraw the film from exhibition in Italy. Here are a few of the many factual discrepancies:
 Early in the film, a montage shows the young Caruso rising through the ranks from operatic chorister to supporting singer, including singing the secondary tenor role of Spoletta in Puccini's opera Tosca. Caruso never sang in an opera chorus, nor did he ever sing a supporting role. When Tosca premiered in January 1900, Caruso was already a rising international opera star and had been considered by Puccini himself for Tosca's starring tenor role of Cavaradossi, though the part was given to another tenor, Emilio De Marchi. When Caruso first sang the role of Cavaradossi in Bologna later that year, Puccini stated that he had never heard the part better sung.
 In the film, Caruso makes his American debut at the Metropolitan Opera in Verdi's Aida and is met with silence from the audience and scathing critical reviews. In reality, Caruso's Met debut in Rigoletto was very well-received, and he became an immediate favorite with New York audiences and critics.
Giulio Gatti-Casazza is depicted in the film as the general manager of the Metropolitan Opera at the time of Caruso's debut there in 1903. In reality, Gatti-Casazza did not arrive at the Met until five years after Caruso's debut, replacing the previous general manager Heinrich Conried in 1908.
 Although the events in the film follow no clear timeline, in real life Caruso met his future wife Dorothy Park Benjamin in 1917 and married her the following year; in the film, Caruso appears to meet Dorothy at the time of his Metropolitan Opera debut in 1903 (In reality, Dorothy Benjamin would have been only ten years old in 1903), and marries her after returning to New York from a long "world tour" which appears to last for several years. In actuality, Caruso never made any such lengthy world tour; while he did frequently perform in Europe, South America, Cuba and other countries, the Metropolitan Opera was Caruso's artistic home, singing there each opera season regularly from 1903 until 1920.
Caruso fathered two sons with Italian soprano Ada Giachetti, during a relationship which lasted from 1898 to 1908; Giachetti was married to another man and there was no divorce in Italy at that time. Caruso's relationship with Giachetti, nor the existence  of their two sons, is depicted or ever mentioned in the film.  
 At the end of the film, Caruso appears to die onstage after a throat hemorrhage during a Metropolitan Opera performance of Martha. Caruso did suffer a throat or mouth hemorrhage during a Met performance of L'elisir d'amore at the Brooklyn Academy of Music on December 11, 1920, causing the performance to be cancelled. On December 24, 1920 Caruso sang the final performance of his career in La Juive at the Met. He became extremely ill on Christmas day and on August 2, 1921, he died in his native Naples, possibly of peritonitis, following many months of illness and several surgical procedures.

Reception

Box Office
The Great Caruso was a massive commercial success and the most profitable film for MGM in 1951. It set a record gross at Radio City Music Hall in New York City, grossing $1,390,943 in ten weeks. According to MGM records, it made $4,309,000 in theatrical rentals in the US and Canada and $4,960,000 elsewhere, resulting in a profit of $3,977,000. The movie was also the most popular at the British box office the same year.

Critics
Newsweek wrote that, "Lanza brings to the role not only a fine, natural and remarkably powerful voice, but a physique and personal mannerisms reminiscent of the immortal Caruso."  According to Bosley Crowther, the film is "perhaps the most elaborate 'pops' concert ever played upon the screen"; Blyth's voice is "reedy"  but "Lanza has an excellent young tenor voice and...uses it in his many numbers with impressive dramatic power. Likewise, Miss Kirsten and Miss Thebom are ladies who can rock the welkin, too, and their contributions to the concert maintain it at a musical high."  Crowther says "All of the silliest, sappiest clichés of musical biography have been written by Sonya Levien and William Ludwig into the script. And Richard Thorpe has directed in a comparably mawkish, bathetic style."

Nearly 40 years after its release, Caruso's son, Enrico Caruso Jr. reminisced that, "Vocally and musically The Great Caruso is a thrilling motion picture, and it has helped many young people discover opera and even become singers themselves." He added that, "I can think of no other tenor, before or since Mario Lanza, who could have risen with comparable success to the challenge of playing Caruso in a screen biography."  The film has also been cited by tenors José Carreras, Plácido Domingo and Luciano Pavarotti as having been an inspiration for them when they were growing up and aspiring to become singers.

Awards and honors
The film was nominated for three Academy Awards; at the 24th Academy Awards ceremony,  Douglas Shearer and the MGM Studio Sound Department won for Best Sound.
The film was also Oscar-nominated for its costume design and its score.

The film is recognized by American Film Institute in these lists:
 2006: AFI's Greatest Movie Musicals – Nominated

Soundtrack
The Great Caruso record album (though not an actual film soundtrack) was issued by RCA Victor on the LP, 45 and 78 RPM formats. The album featured eight popular tenor opera arias (four of which were heard in the film) sung by Lanza, accompanied by Constantine Callinicos conducting the RCA Victor Orchestra. The album sold 100,000 copies before the film premiered and later became the first operatic LP to sell one million copies. After its original 1951 release, the album remained continuously available on LP until the late 1980s and was reissued on compact disc by RCA Victor in 1989.

Trivia
In 1947, radio actor Elliott Lewis was considered the front-runner for the role of Caruso, and was screen-tested in January and June.

References

Bibliography
 Caruso, Enrico Jr. and Farkas, Andrew. Enrico Caruso: My Father and My Family. (Portland Oregon: Amadeus 1990)
 Cesari, Armando. Mario Lanza: An American Tragedy (Fort Worth: Baskerville 2004)

External links
 

1951 films
1950s biographical drama films
American biographical drama films
Biographical films about singers
1950s English-language films
Films about opera
Films directed by Richard Thorpe
Films that won the Best Sound Mixing Academy Award
Metro-Goldwyn-Mayer films
Musical films based on actual events
Films produced by Joe Pasternak
Films with screenplays by William Ludwig
Cultural depictions of Enrico Caruso
1951 drama films
1950s American films